Sheikh Mukhtar Mohamed Hussein (‎; December 9, 1912 – June 12, 2012) was the Speaker of the Parliament of Somalia, and briefly an Acting President of Somalia in 1969.

Early life
Hussein was born into a Hadame family (part of the larger Rahaweyn clan), in the central town of Xuddur in the Bakool region.

Politics
In 1946, Hussein joined the burgeoning, nationalist party of the Somali Youth Club (which later changed its name to the Somali Youth League). He served the SYL's head office in what was then known as Upper Jubba, which included several current regions of Southwestern Somalia.

He died in Nairobi, Kenya in 2012 at 99 years old. He was accorded a state funeral by the government in Mogadishu, Somalia, and was buried there on June 15, 2012.

References

1912 births
2012 deaths
Presidents of Somalia
Speakers of the Parliament of Somalia
Somali Youth League politicians
Somalian centenarians
Men centenarians